"Fanfarrón" is a Latin pop song by Colombian recording artist Fanny Lu. It was written and produced by Lu, José Gaviria and Andrés Munera, for her third studio album. The song was released worldwide on June 29, 2011, followed by the album Felicidad y Perpetua in November.

Music video
The music video was released on August 25 on the Fanny Lu's VEVO and the other video channels. The clip was recorded in the old headquarters of the Bank of America of the Spring St. in the Los Angeles city. It was under the direction by Simon Brand, with whom he had previously worked in past music video´s "Tú no eres para mi" and "Celos". The choreography was directed by Mihran Kirakosian who had worked with Madonna, Britney Spears, Kylie Minogue and others. The wardrobe was designed by the Brit Bardo, while the makeup and the hairstyle were done by Jomari Goyoso. The video uses a unique edit of the song since it incorporates a section of formation drumming with accompanying audio which replaces the song's usual middle eight.

Track listing
"Y Si Te Digo" (Album version) — 3:21
"Fanfarrón" (Tainy's Urban Remix) — 3:18
"Fanfarrón" (Brazuka Power Mix) — 3:57
"Fanfarrón" (Regional Mexican Version) — 3:20

Charts

References

2011 singles
Spanish-language songs
Fanny Lu songs
Record Report Top 100 number-one singles
Record Report Top Latino number-one singles
Music videos directed by Simon Brand
Universal Music Latino singles
2011 songs
Songs written by José Gaviria
Songs written by Fanny Lu
Songs written by Andrés Munera